NGC 1995 (also known as PGC 3325910) is a double star located in the Pictor constellation. It was discovered by John Herschel on December 28, 1834. Its size is 0.78 arc minutes. In some sources, such as VizieR, NGC 1995 is misidentified as the nearby lenticular galaxy NGC 1998.

References

Double stars
J05330310-4840295
1995
3325910
Pictor (constellation)
Astronomical objects discovered in 1834
Discoveries by John Herschel